János Erdei (2 November 1919 – 10 January 1997) was a Hungarian boxer. He competed in the men's featherweight event at the 1952 Summer Olympics.

References

External links
 

1919 births
1997 deaths
Hungarian male boxers
Olympic boxers of Hungary
Boxers at the 1952 Summer Olympics
People from Makó
Featherweight boxers
Sportspeople from Csongrád-Csanád County
20th-century Hungarian people